Nikola Vasilj (born 2 December 1995) is a Bosnian professional footballer who plays as a goalkeeper for 2. Bundesliga club FC St. Pauli and the Bosnia and Herzegovina national team.

Vasilj started his professional career at Zrinjski Mostar, who loaned him to Igman Konjic in 2014 and to Branitelj in 2015. In 2017, he joined 1. FC Nürnberg II. Two years later, he moved to Zorya Luhansk. He signed with FC St. Pauli in 2021.

A former youth international for Bosnia and Herzegovina, Vasilj made his senior international debut in 2021.

Club career

Early career
Vasilj started playing football at a local club, before joining youth academy of his hometown club Zrinjski Mostar in 2010. He made his professional debut against Željezničar on 10 April 2013 at the age of 17. In July 2014, he was sent on a season-long loan to Igman Konjic. In July 2015, he was loaned to Branitelj until the end of season.

In July 2017, Vasilj signed with German side 1. FC Nürnberg.

In July 2019, he joined Ukrainian outfit Zorya Luhansk.

FC St. Pauli
In May 2021, Vasilj moved to FC St. Pauli on a multi-year deal. He made his official debut for the team on 25 July against Holstein Kiel and kept a clean sheet.

International career
Vasilj was a member of Bosnia and Herzegovina under-21 team under coach Vlado Jagodić.

In March 2021, he received his first senior call-up, for 2022 FIFA World Cup qualifiers against Finland and France and a friendly game against Costa Rica. He debuted against Costa Rica on 27 March.

Personal life
Vasilj's father Vladimir was also a goalkeeper, as is his younger brother Filip.

He married his long-time girlfriend Sara in May 2021.

Career statistics

Club

International

Honours
Zrinjski Mostar
Bosnian Premier League: 2013–14, 2015–16

References

External links

1995 births
Living people
Sportspeople from Mostar
Croats of Bosnia and Herzegovina
Bosnia and Herzegovina footballers
Bosnia and Herzegovina under-21 international footballers
Bosnia and Herzegovina international footballers
Bosnia and Herzegovina expatriate footballers
Association football goalkeepers
HŠK Zrinjski Mostar players
FK Igman Konjic players
1. FC Nürnberg II players
FC Zorya Luhansk players
FC St. Pauli players
Premier League of Bosnia and Herzegovina players
First League of the Federation of Bosnia and Herzegovina players
Regionalliga players
Ukrainian Premier League players
2. Bundesliga players
Expatriate footballers in Germany
Expatriate footballers in Ukraine
Bosnia and Herzegovina expatriate sportspeople in Germany
Bosnia and Herzegovina expatriate sportspeople in Ukraine